Andrej Maťašovský (born 20 August 1988) is a Slovak football goalkeeper who currently plays for ŠK 1923 Gabčíkovo.

Club career

ŽP Šport Podbrezová
He made his professional debut for ŽP Šport Podbrezová against FK AS Trenčín on 27 July 2014.

References

External links
 FO ŽP Šport Podbrezová profile
 
 Eurofotbal profile
 Futbalnet profile

1988 births
Living people
Slovak footballers
Slovak expatriate footballers
Association football goalkeepers
FK Dubnica players
FK Železiarne Podbrezová players
FK Dukla Banská Bystrica players
ŠKF Sereď players
KFC Komárno players
ŠK Slovan Bratislava players
ŠK 1923 Gabčíkovo players
Slovak Super Liga players
2. Liga (Slovakia) players
Expatriate footballers in the Czech Republic
Slovak expatriate sportspeople in the Czech Republic